Super Heavy or Superheavy or variant, may refer to:

 SuperHeavy, a supergroup band, 2009–2011
 SuperHeavy (album), the single 2011 album released by the band SuperHeavy
 "SuperHeavy" (song), 2011 song by the eponymous band off their eponymous album
 superheavy isotope (disambiguation), including superheavy atom, superheavy nucleus, superheavy element
 Super Heavy, the first-stage booster rocket of the SpaceX Starship launch system

See also

 superheavy tank
 super-heavy water
 Super heavy-lift launch vehicle rocket
 
 
 
 
 
 
 
 
 Super (disambiguation)
 Heavy (disambiguation)